The Llanelli riots of 1911 were a series of events precipitated by the National Railway Strike of 1911. Mass picketing action at Llanelli railway station was brutally suppressed by the police, resulting in the deaths of two men, shot dead by troops of the Worcestershire Regiment. Rioting followed and magistrates' homes were attacked and railway trucks were set on fire, resulting in an explosion which killed a further four people.

The incident was highly politically sensitive, as the Great Western Railway through Carmarthenshire, southwestern Wales, was the main route between England and the troubles in Ireland. The Riots occurred during a period of great industrial unrest, and involved prominent figures on the international scene such as Lloyd George, Winston Churchill, King George V, and Kaiser Wilhelm of Germany.

Strike and mass picket
The two day industrial action took place on Friday 18 and Saturday 19 August 1911. It was part of the first national railway strike. A joint committee of trade unions was created to co-ordinate industrial action in the town, chaired by Richard Squance.  It organised a mass picket in Llanelli due to the ease with which strikers could blockade the Great Western Railway at Llanelli railway station. The strike itself lasted only two days; it started on Thursday evening, and by Saturday evening a negotiated settlement had been reached. However, by this time a series of clashes with strikers had led to the deployment of a detachment from the Worcestershire Regiment. The involvement of the army was approved by the then Home Secretary, Winston Churchill.

Shootings
On 19 August, during the negotiations, a train containing strikebreaking workers was held up. The commanding officer of the troops, Major Brownlow Stuart, ordered his men to use bayonets to disperse the crowd. The train passed slowly, but was pursued by strikers who boarded it and put out the engine fire, immobilising it. Troops followed, but found themselves boxed in a cutting, as miners approached, some throwing stones. Stuart asked the local Justice of the Peace to read the strikers the Riot Act, which he apparently mumbled reluctantly. Stuart then ordered his men to fire shots towards the crowd. Two young men were shot dead. One was a 21-year-old tinplate worker named John 'Jac' John, who "had joined the picket line to support his less fortunate townsmen." The other was a 19-year-old youth named Leonard Worsell, who was not involved in the conflict, but had just come out into his back garden when he heard the commotion. In his report Major Stuart claimed his soldiers were firing warning shots, and were unaware of the men when they did so, but other witnesses claim they were deliberately targeted.

Riot
The troops action sparked not only the strikers, but also other residents of Llanelli into a day of widespread disorder and rioting. One man was killed when he attempted to use dynamite to open an armoured freight carriage, unaware that the cargo was munitions, resulting in a massive explosion. On the following day three more people died from injuries sustained in the blast. Local historian John Edwards believes a conspiracy between Liberals and the chapels promoted shame though his aunt referred to the Worcesters as "the murderers". As such the riots were rarely spoken of in the town, such that most of its later residents were unaware of one of the more significant events in its history.

See also

 1911 in Wales
 Timeline of Llanelli history
 National coal strike of 1912
 Tonypandy riots, 1910–11

References

Further reading
 
 

1911 crimes in the United Kingdom
1911 in politics
Conflicts in 1911
1911 in Wales
1911 riots
Murder in Wales
History of Llanelli
20th-century history of the British Army
Labour disputes in the United Kingdom
People shot dead by law enforcement officers in the United Kingdom
Rail transport strikes
Riots and civil disorder in Wales
Rail transport in Wales
Human rights abuses in Wales
Police misconduct in Wales
Great Western Railway
20th century in Carmarthenshire
August 1911 events
1911 labor disputes and strikes